Hendrik Wopke "Henk" Rouwé (born 19 July 1946) is a retired Dutch rower. He competed at the 1972 Summer Olympics in the eight event and finished in ninth place.

His elder brother Herman is also an Olympic rower.

References

1946 births
Living people
Dutch male rowers
Olympic rowers of the Netherlands
Rowers at the 1972 Summer Olympics
People from Boarnsterhim
Sportspeople from Friesland
21st-century Dutch people
20th-century Dutch people